Events in the year 1898 in Norway.

Incumbents
 Monarch – Oscar II
Prime Minister: Francis Hagerup (until 17 February), then Johannes Steen

Events
12 January – The National Association for Women's Suffrage is founded by Gina Krog and Hagbard Emanuel Berner
28 February – Melhus IL sports club is founded in Melhus
31 May – A/S Holmenkolbanen open the Holmenkollen Line to Besserud
1 June – HNoMS Storm is launched, one of the oldest ships still in front line service in the Second World War
14 September – Nordal Church in Norddalsfjord is consecrated
27 September – Snillfjord Church is consecrated by Johannes Skaar
30 December – Stryn TIL sports club is founded in Stryn

Popular culture

Sports

Music 

26 June – Edvard Grieg holds Norway's first music festival in Bergen
Olaus Alvestad publishes the songbook Norsk Songbok for Ungdomsskular og Ungdomslag

Theathre

Literature
24 January – Daily newspaper Bladet Tromsø is first printed in Tromsø
August The longest running Northern Sami newspaper, Nuorttanaste, is first printed in Bodø
The political newspapers Budstikka and Søndfjords Avis are founded

Notable births

12 January – Jacob Erstad, gymnast (died 1963)
19 January – Harald Økern, Nordic combined skier (died 1977)
25 January – Sveinung O. Flaaten, politician (died 1962)
1 February – Roald Larsen, speed skater and Olympic silver medallist (died 1959)
13 February – Albert Andreas Mørkved, politician (died 1990)
19 February – Arnold Carl Johansen, politician (died 1957)
2 March – Erling Aastad, long jumper and sprinter (died 1963)
2 March – Nils Thune, politician (died 1988)
8 March – Per Almaas, politician (died 1991)
8 March – Per Næsset, politician (died 1970)
25 March – Einar Landvik, Nordic skier (died 1993)
31 March – Tora Øyna, politician (died 1991)
7 April – Jacob Tullin Thams, skier (died 1954)
17 April – Birger Grønn, engineer and resistance member (died 1988).
20 April – Johan Johannesen, track and field athlete (died 1979)
8 May – Erling Gjone, architect (died 1990).
18 May – Einar Stang, painter and illustrator (died 1984).
19 May – Bjart Ording, horse rider and Olympic silver medallist (died 1975)
14 June – Kristian Alfred Hammer, politician (died 1965)
19 June – Olav Dalgard, filmmaker and literature and art historian (died 1980)
24 June – Bjarne Støtvig, politician (died 1982)
25 June – Anders Lundgren, sailor and Olympic gold medallist (died 1964)
26 June – Ole Reistad, military officer and pentathlete (died 1949)
3 July – Kristian Rønneberg, politician (died 1982)
9 July – Johannes S. Andersen, resistance fighter (died 1968)
1 August – Sverre Steen, historian (died 1983).
5 August – Reidar Magnus Aamo, politician (died 1972)
10 August – Ivar Kornelius Eikrem, politician (died 1994)
10 August – Rolf Hofmo, politician and sports official (died 1966)
23 August – Sigrid Boo, novelist (died 1953)
27 August – Carl Otto Løvenskiold, businessperson (died 1969)
15 September – Bjørn Hougen, archaeologist (died 1976)
19 September – Erik Rotheim, chemical engineer and inventor of the aerosol spray can (died 1938)
2 October – Trond Hegna, journalist and politician (died 1992)
18 October – John Ditlev-Simonsen, sailor and Olympic silver medallist (died 1967)
22 October – Inge Lyse, engineer and resistance member (died 1990)
22 October – Bjørn Skjærpe, gymnast and Olympic silver medallist
20 November – Einar Stavang, politician (died 1992)
29 November – Aagot Børseth, actor (died 1993)
2 December – Henry Jacobsen, politician (died 1964)
3 December – Asbjørn Halvorsen, international soccer player and general secretary of the Norwegian Football Association (died 1955)
4 December – Reimar Riefling, classical pianist, music teacher, and music critic (died 1981)
8 December – 
Christopher Dahl, sailor and Olympic gold medallist (died 1966)
Aslak Nilsen, politician (died 1952).
29 December – Randi Anda, politician (died 1999)

Full date unknown
Conrad Bonnevie-Svendsen, priest and politician (died 1983)
Rolf Gammleng, violinist and organizational leader (died 1984).
Sonja Hagemann, literary historian and literary critic (died 1983)
Odd Hølaas, journalist and writer (died 1968)
Sverre Munck, businessperson (died 1970)
Rolf Østbye, businessperson (died 1979)
Sverre Petterssen, meteorologist (died 1974)
Leif J. Sverdrup, civil engineer and military officer in America (died 1976)

Notable deaths

5 January – Valdemar Knudsen, sugar cane plantation pioneer in Hawaii (born 1819)
2 February – Johan Christian Johnsen, politician (born 1815)
7 September – Karl Hals, businessperson and politician (born 1822)

Full date unknown
Hans Rasmus Astrup, politician (born 1831)
Axel Gudbrand Blytt, botanist (born 1843)
Laura Gundersen, actor (born 1832)
Nils Pedersen Igland, farmer and politician (born 1833)
Holm Hansen Munthe, architect (born 1848)
Johan Jørgen Schwartz, politician and businessperson (born 1824)

See also

References